Tecno Phantom X2 and Tecno Phantom X2 Pro are Android-based smartphones manufactured, released and marketed by Tecno Mobile as part of the phantom sub-brand. The devices were unveiled during an event held on 20 January 2023 as successors to Tecno Phantom X.

The Phantom X2 and Phantom X2 Pro is an upgraded version of Phantom X, coming with different features, including the OS, camera, design and battery. The phone has received generally favorable reviews, with critics mostly noting the performance, bigger battery and fast charging capacity.

Design 
The Phantom X2 and Phantom X2 Pro come with the same design. The phones are fitted with a glass back and a front glass that is covered by Gorilla Glass Victus and an aluminum frame. Both devices come with a camera module that is placed centrally on the rear cover. The display of both phones features a punch hole placed centrally for the front camera.

Specifications

Hardware

Chipsets 
Both devices utilize the MediaTek Dimensity 9000 system-on-chip.

Display 
Both devices feature an AMOLED display with 1080p support and a display size of 6.8-inches. They utilize an optical in-screen fingerprint sensor. The devices have a curved-edge display with an OLED panel and support a 120 Hz refresh rate. They feature a 1080 × 2400 resolution with a 20:9 aspect ratio.

Storage 
The Phantom X2 offers 4/8 GB of RAM, while the Phantom X2 Pro offers 4/12 GB of RAM. Both devices come with 64/128/256 GB of internal storage and lack a microSD card slot.

Battery 
The devices contain a non-removable 5160 mAh Li-Po battery, supporting wired charging over USB-C at up to 45W.

Connectivity 
The phones support 5G network, Wi-Fi 802.11 and Bluetooth 5.3.

Cameras 

The Phantom X2 has a 64 MP wide sensor, a 13 MP ultrawide sensor and a 2 MP depth sensor, while the Phantom X2 Pro has a 50 MP wide sensor, a 13 MP ultrawide sensor and a 50 MP telephoto sensor with 2.5x optical zoom and a retractable lens. The front-facing camera of both devices uses a 32 MP sensor.

Supported video modes 
The Samsung Galaxy S22 series supports the following video modes:
 4K@30/60fps
 1080p@30/60fps

Software 
Both devices run on Android 12 based software overlay HiOS 12 at launch, and come bundled with a slew of apps like IDA Engine 3.0, Aurora Engine, Ella 2.0 and Welife among others.

Reception 
Harish Jonnalagadda from Android Central awarded the Phantom X2 Pro 3.2 stars out of 5, noting that the device "gets a lot right on the hardware side of things". Praise was directed towards the design, operating system, back camera with retractable portrait lens and battery. However, the software lack of refinement was criticized, while noting that "the phone will not get platform updates on time".

Adam Z. Lein from Pocketnow praised the Phantom X2 Pro for its camera, while noting that the device is "a nice entry into the competition as TECNO's flagship".

My Mobile India awarded the Phantom X2 4.5 stars out of 5, noting that the device "is a worthy example with which the company hopes to branch out into flagship territory".

Tech Arena24 praised the Phantom X2 Pro for its camera sensors and Gorilla Glass Victus protection. However, the lack of IP68 water and dust resistance rating, OIS stabilization, wireless charging, HDR10+, Dolby Vision, a brighter screen and up to three years of software update plan were criticized.

Oscar Frank praised the Phantom X2 Pro for its design, camera and processor while noting that the device is a "super smartphone from Tecno, if not the best they have to date". He however criticized the device for its speaker and microphone.

References 

Android (operating system) devices
Phablets
Mobile phones introduced in 2022
Tecno smartphones